Adzi Tepe Airport (Аџи Тепе Аеродром) is an airport in Kumanovo, North Macedonia.

Events
Airshow Kumanovo is held at the airport.

See also
 Kumanovo

External links
Aeromiting Adzi Tepe Kumanovo 2003 Photos
Aero Club contact Аероклуб Куманово

References

Buildings and structures in Kumanovo
Airports in North Macedonia